Ángel de Juana García (born 15 February 1968), known as Geli, is a Spanish retired footballer who played as a midfielder.

Football career
Aged already 25, Geli made his La Liga debuts with hometown club Racing de Santander, courtesy of manager Javier Irureta. He then played a single season with Real Zaragoza after joining in the 1994 summer: regularly used in the league, where he scored in a 2–1 home win against FC Barcelona, he also played the last six minutes in the Aragonese side's 2–1 UEFA Cup Winners' Cup final triumph over Arsenal, appearing in a further seven games in the victorious campaign.

During his three seasons at Celta de Vigo Geli, who would again reunite with Irureta in his final year, played in 61 top flight matches, but also struggled with injuries and loss of form. He played one more year with Racing, then finished his career at the age of 36 after stints at CF Extremadura (second division) and Gimnástica de Torrelavega (third).

Geli later worked as a local commentator in Racing's matches.

Coaching career
From July 2016 until July 2019, Geli was the manager of CD Tropezón.

Honours
Zaragoza
UEFA Cup Winners' Cup: 1994–95

References

External links
Stats at Liga de Fútbol Profesional 

1968 births
Living people
Spanish footballers
Footballers from Santander, Spain
Association football midfielders
La Liga players
Segunda División players
Segunda División B players
Racing de Santander players
Real Zaragoza players
RC Celta de Vigo players
CF Extremadura footballers
Gimnástica de Torrelavega footballers